The Rinard Covered Bridge, near Marietta, Ohio, was built in 1876. It was listed on the National Register of Historic Places in 1976.

It is a Smith truss bridge built by the Smith Bridge Company of Toledo, Ohio and is a work of H. H. Townsend. It has also been known as Hendershott's Ford Bridge.

It is located northeast of Wingett Run on County Road 406 in Ludlow Township, Washington County, Ohio.

It spans the Little Muskingum River. The bridge was destroyed by a flash flood on September 18, 2004 and was rebuilt in 2006.

It is covered in the Ohio Historic Places Dictionary.

See also
List of bridges documented by the Historic American Engineering Record in Ohio

References

External links

Covered bridges in Ohio
Historic American Engineering Record in Ohio
National Register of Historic Places in Washington County, Ohio
Bridges completed in 1876